Ryan Higgins may refer to:

 Ryan Higgins (English cricketer) (born 1995), English cricketer
 Ryan Higgins (Zimbabwean cricketer) (born 1988), Zimbabwean cricketer